The Nicolai–Cake–Olson House is a residence located in northeast Portland, Oregon listed on the National Register of Historic Places.

Designed by Portland architect Emil Schacht in the Arts and Crafts style, it was built in 1905–6. The interior retains much of its historic integrity, as the Olsons, who owned it from 1925 to 1967, maintained it in its original condition after some early changes.

See also
 National Register of Historic Places listings in Northeast Portland, Oregon

References

1905 establishments in Oregon
Bungalow architecture in Oregon
Houses completed in 1906
Houses on the National Register of Historic Places in Portland, Oregon
Irvington, Portland, Oregon
Portland Historic Landmarks